Rudolph V. Kuser Estate is located in Trenton, Mercer County, New Jersey, United States. The building was built in 1905 and was added to the National Register of Historic Places on August 24, 1979.

See also
National Register of Historic Places listings in Mercer County, New Jersey

References

Colonial Revival architecture in New Jersey
Houses completed in 1905
Houses in Trenton, New Jersey
Houses on the National Register of Historic Places in New Jersey
National Register of Historic Places in Trenton, New Jersey
New Jersey Register of Historic Places
1905 establishments in New Jersey